Ferhan Nil Karaibrahimgil (born 17 October 1976) is a Turkish singer and songwriter, mostly noted for her distinct lyrics. Nil's passion and admiration for music stems from her father, Suavi Karaibrahimgil, who is also a musician although he is not active in the Turkish music industry.

Biography
In 2000, Karaibrahimgil graduated from Boğaziçi University with a degree in political science and international relations. She also further received the Crystal Apple prize award twice, which recognized her achievements in advertising. Besides academic success, Nil has found fortune in the Turkish music scene. Many of her songs deal with women, freedom, life, love, marriage and relationships. Her articles have been published weekly in Hürriyet, a daily Turkish newspaper, since 2004. On 21 January 2010, she married Sertab Erener's brother Serdar Erener near the shore of the Nile River. She has a son named Aziz Arif, born in May 2014.

Discography

Albums

Non-album singles
 "Hakkında Her Şeyi Duymak İstiyorum" (2011)
 "Kanatlarım Var Ruhumda" (2014)
 "Gençliğime Sevgilerle" (2016)
 "Bizi Anlatsam" (2016)
 "Niltemenni" (2016)
 "Benden Sana" (2017)
 "Annelere Ninni" (2017)
 "Vah ki Ne Vah" (2017)
 "İyi ki" (2018)
 "Sakız Adası" (2020)
 "Özlüyorum" (2020)
 "Daha Fazla Sen" (2020)
 "Hep Yanımda Kal" (2021)
 "Diskotek" (2021)
 "Hikayenin Peşini Bırakma" (2021)
 "Uyan Anne" (2021)
 "Boy" (2022)

Charts

Guest appearances

Filmography

Books 
  (Butterflies of the Nile), 320p, 2011, Doğan Kitap, 
  (Life Secrets of the Butterfly), 296p, 2015, Doğan Novus, 
 , 2018, Doğan Novus, 
 , 2019, Doğan Novus,

Notes

References

External links
 
 Official web site: NilKaraibrahimgil.com / NilTakipte.com
 
 
 
 

1976 births
Living people
Alternative rock musicians
Turkish dance musicians
Women rock singers
Musicians from Ankara
Turkish pop singers
Turkish rock singers
Turkish singer-songwriters
Women in electronic music
21st-century Turkish women singers
21st-century Turkish singers